Mrityudand (English: Death Sentence) is an Indian Hindi drama film released in 1997. It was directed and produced by Prakash Jha and stars Madhuri Dixit, Shabana Azmi, Ayub Khan, Mohan Agashe and Om Puri.

The film is a commentary on the social and the gender injustice. As in his other movies, filmmaker Prakash Jha has focussed on the social problems that plague his native state of Bihar, India, and like his other movies this one straddles the boundary between art film and commercial film. The film also boasted of some semi-classical music, tuned by Anand–Milind and Raghunath Seth and worded by Javed Akhtar. The film was critically acclaimed and is considered to be one of Madhuri Dixit's best performances.

Synopsis
The movie is set in the village of Bilaspur, Bihar in 1996. Its plot starts with the grisly portrayal of a mob killing of two defenseless women, orchestrated by vested interests, and how village power players later evade administrative inquiries into this atrocity. This incident sets the tone for much of the rest of the movie.

The central characters are a young couple, Vinay (Ayub Khan) and Ketki (Madhuri Dixit). They are quickly plunged into the midst of machinations by several powerful and unscrupulous villagers. Foremost among them is contractor Tirpat Singh (Mohan Joshi), a powerful, corrupt and ruthless man who oppresses poor people and especially women with impunity. Vinay too becomes influenced by Tirpat, and under this influence spirals down a dark road of domestic abuse, alcoholism, and selfishness that alienates his loving wife and tears apart the whole family, despite her best efforts to fight this.

The rest of the movie deals with their efforts to break out of this morass, both within their relationship as well as outside of it, and Vinay's and especially Ketki's long, hard, and bloody struggle to confront and defeat the forces of oppression and male domination in the village.

Cast
 Madhuri Dixit as Ketki Singh
 Shabana Azmi as Chandravati
 Ayub Khan as Vinay Singh
 Om Puri as Rambaran Mahto
 Shilpa Shirodkar as Kanti
 Mohan Joshi as Tirpat Singh
 Mohan Agashe as Abhay Singh
 Harish Patel as MLA Durga Pandey
 Achyut Potdar as Ketki's father (Special Appearance)
 Mona Ambegaonkar in a Special Appearance

Soundtrack
"Keh Do Ek Bar Sajana Itna Kyu Pyar Sajna" - Udit Narayan, Alka Yagnik
"Raat Maheke To Yun Bhi Hota Hai Chand" - Sadhana Sargam, Hariharan
"Itani Hai Mori Kahani Ke Raja Mai To Ho Gayi Tori Diwani" - Sadhana Sargam
"Kab Se Main Hun Khadi Beech Dhare, Dur Nadiya Ke" - Sadhana Sargam
"Tum Bin Man Ki Bat Adhuri, Din Hai Adhure" - Kumar Sanu, Sadhana Sargam

Awards

Special Jury Award, Best Feature Film, Cinéma Tout Ecran, Geneva (1998)
Audience Award, Best Feature Film, Bangkok Film Festival (1998)
Best Actress, Madhuri Dixit, Screen Awards (1998)
Best Supporting Actress, Shabana Azmi, Screen Awards (1998)
Best Actor In A Negative Role, Mohan Joshi, Screen Awards (1998)
Best Director, Prakash Jha, Zee Cine Awards (1998)
Best Dialogue Writer, Prakash Jha, Zee Cine Awards (1998)
Best Sound (Re-recording), Zee Cine Awards (1998)
Best Feature Film (Critics' Choice), Prakash Jha, Sansui Awards (1998)
Best Actress, Madhuri Dixit, Sansui Awards (1998)

Reception
Anupama Chopra of India Today wrote "Mrityudand is not a great film but it is a good one. It can't match the power of a Thelma & Louise or Mirch Masala but it packs a solid wallop. And in these dumb and dumber times, it is a refreshing change." The reviewer for Screen called the film "a superbly crafted web of intrigue that gets darker and murkier till it reaches horrifying proportions of cruelty and ferociousness" and that it is "passionate, highly articulate, and never confused." They felt that the film "questions the limited definition of woman merely as a wife or a mother, and goes on to show strong women who define themselves as individuals." Commending the acting performances, the reviewer wrote, "While Madhuri is her usual fiery self, Shabana fits perfectly into the role of a woman who chooses to rejuvenate her life ... Mohan Joshi and Mohan Agashe are as detestable and evil as could be. But the greatest surprise of the film is Ayub Khan. He has had the rare opportunity to prove his mettle opposite veteran actresses Madhuri and Shabana, and he has held his own admirably. He is dashing and full of passion, and no way does he seem a novice when it comes to romancing the beautiful Dixit." They concluded writing, "Prakash Jha deserves a pat for the manner in which he treated the film ... Here is a film which not only has something to say, but says it well. There are no hysterical histrionics. There is no hypocrisy and false rhetoric which one finds so often in films which profess to be socially progressive for women. The songs are situational and elegant."

Mrityudand was invited for the gala premiere at BFI London Film Festival in 1997.

The film was also received well by audiences upon theatrical release. 75 per cent collection were reported on the first day of release. It was declared tax-free in theatres of Mumbai.

References

External links

1997 films
Films directed by Prakash Jha
Films scored by Anand–Milind
Films set in Bihar
1990s Hindi-language films
Indian drama films
1997 drama films
Hindi-language drama films
Films about capital punishment
Films about violence against women